Mile-a-minute may refer to:

People

 Charles Minthorn Murphy (1870–1950), nicknamed "Mile-a-minute" Murphy, American bicycle racer
 Mick Murphy (cyclist) (1934–2015), Irish cyclist, also nicknamed "Mile-a-minute" Murphy

Plants
 Dipogon lignosus, a species of flowering plant in the legume family
 Fallopia baldschuanica, a species of flowering plant in the knotweed family
 Ipomoea cairica, a species of morning glory
 Mikania micrantha, a tropical plant in the family Asteraceae
 Persicaria perfoliata, (basionym Polygonum perfoliatum), a species of flowering plant in the buckwheat family

See also
 0 to 60 mph, the time to reach a mile-a-minute from rest